Cateno Roberto De Luca (born 18 March 1972) is an Italian politician, mayor of Messina from 2018 to 2022.

Biography

Mayor of Fiumedinisi and Santa Teresa di Riva
De Luca was born in Fiumedinisi. At the age of 18 he began his political career by being elected to the city council of his city and at the age of 22 he was appointed councilor to the municipality. After losing to the municipal elections of 1998 for the nomination of the new mayor of Fiumedinisi, he reapplied in 2003, succeeding this time to win. Reconfirmed mayor in 2008, two years before he is a candidate for the Regional Sicilian Regional elections, being elected and reconfirmed in the elections of 2008 and 2012.

In 2011 he resigned as mayor of his city and ran the following year as mayor of Santa Teresa di Riva, winning the first round and remaining in office until 2017.

Member of the ARS
At the regional elections of 2006 he was elected deputy to the Sicilian Regional Assembly with the Movement for the Autonomies, among whose ranks he was re-elected also to the successive regional of 2008. 

At the regional Sicilian in 2012 he was a candidate for the Presidency of the region, supported by the Sicilian Revolution list, obtaining however only 1.23% of the votes, not being simultaneously re-elected to the ARS. 

In 2017 he founded the Sicilia Vera movement, which will make an agreement with the UDC in view of the Sicilian regional elections of 5 November 2017: De Luca is re-elected member of the ARS among the ranks of the Union of the Center. 

Three days after the elections, on 8 November, he was arrested on charges of tax evasion. Under house arrest, this conviction is subsequently revoked and replaced by an interdictive measure of the prohibition to hold top positions in the bodies involved in the investigation.

Mayor of Messina
In 2018 he was a candidate for mayor of Messina in view of the administrative with the support of six centrist civic lists. He was elected to the ballot on 24 June with 65.28% of the votes, beating the centre-right candidate Placido Bramanti.

References

1972 births
Living people
20th-century Italian politicians
Mayors of Messina
21st-century Italian politicians